Väino Uibo (born on 7 October 1942 in Tartu) is an Estonian actor, director and theatre leader.

In 1970 he graduated from the Tallinn State Conservatory Performing Arts Department. 1970–1975 and 1977–1981 he was an actor at Vanemuine theatre, 1981–1989 at Ugala Theatre.

1998–2001 he was the head of the Kuressaare Town Theatre. Besides theatre roles he has played also in three films.

From 1993 until 1998, he was the mayor of Elva.

Filmography
 1971: Tuuline rand (feature film; role: Jaan)
 1972: Väike reekviem suupillile (feature film; role: Heiki)
 1976: Aeg elada, aeg armastada (feature film; role: Silver)

References

1942 births
Estonian male stage actors
Estonian male film actors
Estonian male television actors
Estonian male radio actors
20th-century Estonian male actors
21st-century Estonian male actors
Estonian theatre directors
Mayors of places in Estonia
Estonian Academy of Music and Theatre alumni
Male actors from Tartu
Living people